Amaninamide is a cyclic peptide. It is one of the amatoxins, all of which are found in several members of the mushroom genera Amanita, Lepiota and Galerina. It differs from alpha-amanitin in lacking the hydroxyl group on tryptophan. This alters its UV absorption spectrum but not its toxicity.

Toxicology

Like other amatoxins, amaninamide is an inhibitor of RNA polymerase II.  Upon ingestion, it binds to the RNA polymerase II enzyme which completely prevents mRNA synthesis, effectively causing cytolysis of hepatocytes (liver cells) and kidney cells.

See also
Mushroom poisoning

References

External links
Amatoxins REVISED 
Poisonous Mushrooms (German)

Peptides
Amatoxins
Hepatotoxins
Tryptamines